So Dark may refer to:

 So Dark (TV series) American fantasy horror vampire TV series first aired in May 2017.
 "So Dark", song by Prince from Crystal Ball (box set)

See also
 How Did We Get So Dark?, album by Royal Blood